The 1995 Bulgarian Cup Final was played at the Vasil Levski National Stadium in Sofia on 27 May 1995, and was contested between the sides of Lokomotiv Sofia and Botev Plovdiv. The match was won by Lokomotiv Sofia.

Match

Details

See also
1994–95 A Group

Bulgarian Cup finals
Botev Plovdiv matches
Cup Final